Ruellia brevifolia, the tropical wild petunia or red Christmas pride, is an ornamental plant in the family Acanthaceae. It is native to South America, from Colombia to southern Brazil and northern Argentina.

References

External links
Pacific Island Ecosystems at Risk (PIER): Ruellia brevifolia
USDA Plants Profile: Ruellia brevifolia
  Ruellia brevifolia (Pohl) Ezcurra (Acanthaceae): flowering phenology, pollination biology and reproduction Rev. bras. Bot. vol.25 no.1  São Paulo Mar. 2002

brevifolia
Flora of Brazil
Garden plants
Flora of Peru